Vereeniging Commando was a light infantry regiment of the South African Army. It formed part of the South African Army Infantry Formation as well as the South African Territorial Reserve.

History

Origin 
The Vereeniging Commando was formed in 1921 as a Shooting Commando and its first Commander was Lt Col Karel Rood.

Operations

With the UDF
The Shooting Commando received its official status as a Commando in 1957 and in 1961 received its first Citizen Force members.

With the SADF
During this era, the unit was mainly used for area force protection, search and cordones as well as stock theft control assistance to the rural police.

Freedom of Entry
The Commando received the Freedom of Entry to the city of Vereeniging on 14 February 1976.

National Colours 
On 16 August 1991, the commanding officer Cmdt J.C. Kruger, accepted the award of National Colours on behalf of the unit.

With the SANDF

Disbandment 
This unit, along with all other Commando units was disbanded after a decision by South African President Thabo Mbeki to disband all Commando Units. The Commando system was phased out between 2003 and 2008 "because of the role it played in the apartheid era", according to the Minister of Safety and Security Charles Nqakula.

On Friday 29 September 2006 Vereeniging Commando finally closed its doors when Lt Col J.C. Zelie handed the VMB keys over to the Department of Public Works.

Insignia

Leadership

References

See also 
 South African Commando System

Infantry regiments of South Africa
South African Commando Units